Pet Sematary Two is a 1992 American horror film directed by Mary Lambert. The screenplay was written by Richard Outten. It is the sequel to the film Pet Sematary (1989) which was based on Stephen King's 1983 novel of the same name. The film stars Edward Furlong, Anthony Edwards, and Clancy Brown. Pet Sematary Two was theatrically released in the United States on August 28, 1992, by Paramount Pictures and grossed $17.1 million worldwide. It received negative reviews from critics, but Clancy Brown's performance received critical acclaim.

Plot
A few years after the events of the first film and following the accidental death of his mother Renee, 13-year-old Jeff Matthews and his veterinarian father, Chase, move to Ludlow, Maine, his mother's hometown. He's introduced to the belligerent town sheriff, Gus Gilbert, and his stepson, Drew, whom Gus abuses relentlessly. Jeff also draws the ire of local bully Clyde Parker, who tells him the story of the Creed family and the legend of the Miꞌkmaq burial ground.

One night, Gus shoots and kills Drew's beloved dog Zowie after the dog disturbs him during sex. Drew asks Jeff to help him bury the dog in the Miꞌkmaq burial ground to see if the rumors are true that it can resurrect the dead. Zowie does indeed return from the dead but is uncharacteristically fierce. Chase treats Zowie for his gunshot wound, which refuses to heal; even more bizarre is the fact that Zowie has no heartbeat. Chase sends a sample of Zowie's blood to a lab. It turns out that Zowie's cells have completely deteriorated and are no different from those of a dead canine.

Jeff and Drew go to the Pet Semetery on Halloween for a night of horror stories with local boys. When Gus finds out that Drew's mother allowed him to go despite being grounded, he rushes to the cemetery and breaks up the party. He attacks his stepson, but just as he is about to hit him with a grave marker, Zowie appears. The dog fatally mauls Gus, whom the boys subsequently bury at the Indian burial ground. Gus returns to life; he now moves stiffly and rarely speaks, but treats Drew better. Over time, Gus becomes increasingly crude and sadistic, sexually assaulting Drew's mother and brutally skinning the pet rabbits for supper.

Zowie breaks out of the veterinary clinic and kills three cats before entering Chase's home and attacking him. A day later, Jeff encounters Clyde, who is about to sever Jeff's nose using the wheel spokes of his own bicycle when Gus shows up. He sends Jeff home, then murders Clyde as Drew looks on. Gus then pursues Drew to their house, where the boy is trapped with the savage Zowie. He escapes through a window just as his mother arrives home in her car, and the two take off. Gus pursues them at high speed in his squad car, eventually killing them both by ramming their car into an oncoming potato truck. Gus then returns to Clyde's body and puts it in a body bag, intending to take it to the burial ground as well.

After Drew's funeral, Jeff decides to reanimate his mother by using the Indian burial ground's power. Gus exhumes her corpse and brings it to Jeff at the burial ground. When Chase hears that his wife's grave has been robbed, he rushes to the Gilbert house. There, he is attacked by Zowie and Gus, and he shoots and kills them both.

Upon coming back to life, Renee stabs and kills Marjorie Hargrove, the Matthews' housekeeper. Jeff confronts his undead mother in the attic, and they embrace. Chase arrives home and urges Jeff to get away from Renee, who says she wants to spend quality time with her husband. An undead Clyde arrives and, after knocking Chase out, tries to kill Jeff — first with an axe and then with an ice skate. Renee locks Chase and both boys in the attic, which she then sets on fire.

Jeff kills Clyde with a severed livewire and then breaks down the attic door to escape. Not letting both Jeff and Chase leave, Renee says that she wants the three of them to work things out. Renee wants Jeff to stay and join her in death, saying she loves him. But Jeff drags his father out of the house as Renee is destroyed by the flames while shrieking "Dead is better!" In the final scene, a recovering Chase locks up his veterinary clinic before he and his son leave Ludlow behind.

Cast
Edward Furlong as Jeff Matthews
Jason McGuire as Drew Gilbert
Anthony Edwards as Dr. Chase Matthews
Darlanne Fluegel as Renee Hallow-Matthews
Jared Rushton as Clyde Parker
Sarah Trigger as Marjorie Hargrove
Lisa Waltz as Amanda Gilbert
Clancy Brown as Gus Gilbert

Production
Paramount was anxious to follow up on the success of Pet Sematary with a sequel and invited Mary Lambert to return and direct. She has stated that her original concept for the film would have involved Ellie Creed as the central character, the only survivor from the first film. However, Paramount was not confident in making the film's lead a teenage girl, so the story was written with completely new characters and a male protagonist. Thirteen-year-old Furlong was cast in the lead role, capitalizing on his rise to fame in the previous year's blockbuster Terminator 2: Judgment Day.  Shooting took place in Coweta County, Georgia.

Release
Stephen King, who wrote the novel upon which the first film was based, had his name removed from the film prior to its release. The film debuted at #3.

Home media
Paramount Home Video released Pet Sematary Two on VHS in April 1993, and on DVD in September 2001. Shout Factory released it on Blu-ray on February 25, 2020.

The original score / soundtrack album was released on CD as a limited edition from La-La Land Records on August 29, 2019, and on limited-edition vinyl (October 11, 2019) and audio cassette (September 3, 2019) from Terror Vision Records.

Reception
Rotten Tomatoes, a review aggregator, reports that 22% of 23 critics gave the film a positive review and the average rating was 3.70/10. The site's consensus reads, "Not realizing that it had no unfinished business, Pet Sematary rises from the grave once more to beat an undead corpse." On Metacritic, the film has a weighted average score of 35 out of 100 based on 11 critics, indicating "generally unfavorable reviews".

Stephen Holden of The New York Times wrote that the film "is much better at special effects than at creating characters or telling a coherent story". Kevin Thomas of the Los Angeles Times wrote, "Not nearly as scary as the 1989 original, it nonetheless expresses and attempts to resolve in bold mythological terms the anxieties of being 13." Variety wrote, "Pet Sematary Two is about 50% better than its predecessor, which is to say it's not very good at all."  Richard Harrington of The Washington Post likened it to "an elongated Tales from the Crypt" episode and criticized the script as a rehash of the original. Jay Carr of The Boston Globe called it "better entertainment than the first Pet Sematary" but more of a remake than a sequel. Patrick Naugle of DVD Verdict wrote, "Everything about Pet Sematary Two stinks like the dead."

Accolade 
Clancy Brown was nominated for Best Supporting Actor at the 1993 Fangoria Chainsaw Awards for his portrayal of Gus Gilbert, but lost to Anthony Hopkins for his performance in Bram Stoker's Dracula.

References

External links

 
  
 
 

1992 films
1992 horror films
American supernatural horror films
American sequel films
American zombie films
Films set in Maine
Films shot in Georgia (U.S. state)
Paramount Pictures films
Films directed by Mary Lambert
Films set in cemeteries
Resurrection in film
American teen horror films
Pet Sematary
1990s English-language films
1990s American films